Papilio delalandei is a butterfly of the family Papilionidae. It is endemic to Madagascar.

Taxonomy
Papilio delalandei is a member of the dardanus species-group. The
members of the clade are

Papilio dardanus Brown, 1776
Papilio constantinus Ward, 1871
Papilio delalandei Godart, [1824]
Papilio phorcas Cramer, [1775]
Papilio rex Oberthür, 1886

Biogeographic realm
Afrotropical realm

Etymology
The name honours Pierre Antoine Delalande.

References

External links

Butterflycorner Images from Naturhistorisches Museum Wien

Butterflies described in 1824
delalandei